Antrim Township may refer to:

Antrim Township, Michigan
Antrim Township, Watonwan County, Minnesota
Antrim Township, Wyandot County, Ohio
Antrim Township, Franklin County, Pennsylvania

Township name disambiguation pages